David Rakowski (born June 13, 1958, St. Albans, Vermont) is an American composer and typeface designer.  He studied under such composers as Robert Ceely, John Heiss, Milton Babbitt, Peter Westergaard, Paul Lansky, and Luciano Berio.  In 2006, he was awarded the Chamber Music Society of Lincoln Center's 2004–2006 Elise L. Stoeger Prize.  He has twice been a finalist for the Pulitzer Prize for Music: in 1999 for Persistent Memory and in 2002 for his second symphony Ten of a Kind.

He has released dozens of typefaces since the 1990s, mostly as freeware, which include both original designs and revivals (such as "Lemiesz" – a free version of Publicity Gothic, 1916 – and "Harting", a typewriter face in the "grunge" style.)

References

Living people
1958 births
People from St. Albans, Vermont
American male classical composers
American classical composers
20th-century classical composers
21st-century classical composers
Musicians from Vermont
MacDowell Colony fellows
20th-century American male musicians
21st-century American male musicians
American typographers and type designers
Members of the American Academy of Arts and Letters